The Base is a neo-Nazi accelerationist paramilitary group and training network, formed in 2018 by Rinaldo Nazzaro. It is active in the United States, Canada, Australia, South Africa, and Europe.

History
The group was founded in June 2018 by Rinaldo Nazzaro, who uses the pseudonyms Norman Spear and Roman Wolf. Nazzaro was reported to have bought several blocks of off-the-grid land in Washington state, United States, in 2018 for use as a survivalist training camp.

Nazzaro, who used to work for the FBI and the Pentagon, moved to Russia around the time he created The Base, and directs the group's activities from there. In November 2020, a feature-length interview with Nazzaro was broadcast on Russian state television.

Ideology and status

The Base is a white nationalist accelerationist paramilitary group and training network. It advocates the formation of white ethnostates, a goal which it believes it can achieve via terrorism and the violent overthrow of existing governments. The group's vetting process serves to connect committed extremists with terroristic skills to produce real-world violence. It organizes "race war preppers" and operates "hate camps", or training camps. The group has links to the Atomwaffen Division and the Feuerkrieg Division, which are far-right extremist groups.

Nazzaro has characterized The Base as a "survivalism and self-defense network ... sharing knowledge and training to prepare for crisis situations", but he denies its connections to neo-Nazism. Nazzaro has stated that his goal is to "build a cadre of trainers across the country."

The Base has been designated as a terrorist entity by the following countries:

Canada (February 3, 2021)
United Kingdom (July 12, 2021)
Australia (November 24, 2021)
New Zealand (June, 2022)

Recruitment strategies
The group is active across the United States, and it is also active in Canada. Before his identity was revealed in January 2020, Nazzaro, known online as "Roman Wolf" and "Norman Spear", was personally involved in active recruitment, with the aim of forming cells in Europe, South Africa and Australia.

The Base has recruited members by using iFunny, a meme social media website. In secure chat forums, VICE noted members designing memes to spread as propaganda.

Propaganda from a The Base training camp near Spokane, Washington was posted in August 2019.

In late 2019 and early 2020, secret recordings were made of some of The Base's recruitment activities. The tapes include its attempts to recruit several Australians, including a 17-year-old teenager and a Western Australian man, Dean Smith, who ran for parliament for Pauline Hanson's One Nation party. Another Australian who went by the name of Volkskrieger was a key person in the recruitment drive, which focused on finding people with legal access to firearms and security licences.

Activities

Anti-Semitic activities
Richard Tobin and The Base were linked to synagogue vandalism in Racine, Wisconsin, and Hancock, Michigan, which occurred a day apart in September 2019. Court documents allege that Tobin organized the vandalism, then named the two members of The Base who he assigned to vandalize the synagogues. Tobin called the event "Operation Kristallnacht".

Yousef O. Barasneh, a Neo-Nazi Arab whose father immigrated from Amman, spray-painted swastikas and other anti-Semitic symbols and slogans on Beth Israel Sinai Congregation in the city of Racine, Wisconsin sometime between September 15 and 23, 2019.

Virginia protests
On 16 January 2020, three members of The Base were arrested by the FBI just before a gun rights protest, 2020 VCDL Lobby Day, was scheduled to be held at the Virginia State Capitol in Richmond. The FBI had six members under surveillance for several months and had set up CCTV cameras inside the group's apartment to observe them and to prevent them from causing any harm. According to FBI documents, three members were discussing "the planning of violence at a specific event in Virginia, scheduled for January 20, 2020." On January 17, the trio were indicted for illicit activities. The next day, three additional members were arrested for plotting to "derail trains" and poison water supplies. FBI recordings released in November 2021 showed two of the men discussed mass murder of black persons to trigger a race war; they were both sentenced to nine years in prison in October 2021.

Other incidents
On the night of December 11, 2019, two members – Justen Watkins and Alfred Gorman – appeared at a residential home in the town of Dexter, Michigan. There, they shined lights and took photographs on the front porch. Watkins and Gorman incorrectly believed the home belonged to an "antifa" podcaster, Daniel Harper of I Don't Speak German, and the pair intended to threaten him. Unknown to them, it was the home of an unrelated family. Watkins and Gorman uploaded their photos to a Telegram channel used by The Base. On October 29, 2020, Watkins and Gorman were apprehended by the FBI, and charged with gang membership, unlawful posting of a message, and using computers to commit a crime. According to VICE News, between the attempted intimidation incident and his arrest, leaked chat logs revealed Watkins was planning a "fortified compound" in the Upper Peninsula of Michigan. In the said logs, he was discussing plans to purchase homes and land (and subsequently fortify them) with members on Wire, wanting to establish an enclave to house and train members.

In April 2021, two men were indicted in Floyd County, Georgia, for alleged theft and ritual beheading of an animal. The assistant district attorney said a "dozen members of The Base" participated in the blood-drinking ritual.

Notable members

Rinaldo Nazzaro 
Rinaldo Nazzaro uses the pseudonyms Norman Spear and Roman Wolf. Nazzaro used to work for the Federal Bureau of Investigation (FBI) as an analyst and he also used to work as a contractor for The Pentagon, and he also claims to have served in Iraq and Afghanistan. Nazzaro owned a security contracting firm, Omega Solutions International LLC. He is a white supremacist and a supporter of the Northwest Territorial Imperative, which proposes the creation of "a separatist ethnostate in the Pacific north-west".

With his wife, Nazzaro resides in Saint Petersburg, Russia, according to BBC News; an apartment in the city was purchased in his wife's name in July 2018, the same month in which The Base was founded. A video posted online in May 2019 shows Nazzaro, apparently in Russia, wearing a t-shirt with an image of President Vladimir Putin and the words "Russia, absolute power". The BBC also reported that in 2019, Nazzaro was listed as a guest at a Russian government security exhibition in Moscow. Some members of The Base suspected that Nazzaro was connected to Russian intelligence, which Nazzaro denies. In November 2020, a feature-length interview with Nazzaro was broadcast on Russian state television.

Others

Jason Lee Van Dyke
Jason Lee Van Dyke, the former lawyer and one-time leader of the Proud Boys, who was recently alleged to have tried to plot the assassination of a rival, attempted to join the Base, but was denied membership for being a "huge liability". In an effort to convince the group's leaders that he should be allowed to join the Base and would be a productive member, Van Dyke offered up his expertise in weapons training and his property in Decatur, Texas for a paramilitary camp.

Patrik Jordan Mathews

A combat engineer master corporal, Patrik Jordan Mathews (a.k.a. Dave Arctorum or "coincidence detector") of the Canadian Armed Forces Reserve, was identified as one of the three arrested. Earlier, on 16 August 2019, Mathews had been outed as organizing a terrorist cell for The Base and Atomwaffen in Manitoba via undercover reporting by the Winnipeg Free Press. He was also described as putting up posters to "intimidate and threaten local anti-fascist activists". Other posters in Manitoba, which began appearing in July, stated "Save your Race, Join The Base" and "The Base: Learn Train Fight". Vice News also discovered he had participated in a training camp in the U.S. state of Georgia. While not charging him, on August 19, the RCMP searched his home in Beausejour, Manitoba and seized guns. The military had been alerted about Mathews in April and launched an investigation in July. By August 24, he had gone missing and was reported as being voluntarily released from the Forces.

Mathews' truck was found near the border in Piney, Manitoba, and it was assumed he had entered the United States illegally. It is possible Mathews was assisted by a Minnesota cell of The Base. Arrested in January 2020, Mathews and Brian M. Lemley Jr., 33, pleaded guilty to weapons charges in Greenbelt MD, and were sentenced in October 2021 to nine years in prison.  William G. Bilbrough IV, 19, was sentenced to five years for illegally bringing the Canadian into the USA.

Luke Austin Lane
Luke Austin Lane was a cell leader of The Base and an Order of Nine Angles follower. His cell consisted of a few members in Georgia and was particularly militant. He would practice firearms training with his cell, videoing their activities and posting the film online for propaganda purposes. In January 2020, Lane and two accomplices, Jacob Oliver Kaderli and Michael John Helterbrand  were arrested for allegedly stockpiling weapons and plotting to kill an anti-fascist couple and their young children. In preparation, Lane, along with dozen other people, engaged in paramilitary training, consumed psychedelic drugs, sacrificed a ram, and drank its blood in an occult ritual on his property.

See also
 Antisemitism in Canada
 Antisemitism in Europe
 Antisemitism in the United States
 History of antisemitism in the United States
 Atomwaffen Division
 Far-right politics
 Far-right subcultures
 Fascism in Canada
 Fascism in Europe
 Fascism in North America
 James Mason
 National Socialist Movement (United States)
 Patriot Front
 Racism in Europe
 Racism in North America
 Racism in the United States
 Radical right (Europe)
 Radical right (United States)
 Right-wing terrorism
 Terrorgram
 Terrorism in Canada
 Terrorism in Europe
 Terrorism in the United States
 Domestic terrorism in the United States
 Völkisch movement
 I Don't Speak German
 List of fascist movements
 List of Ku Klux Klan organizations
 List of neo-Nazi organizations
 List of organizations designated by the Southern Poverty Law Center as hate groups#Neo-Nazi
 List of white nationalist organizations

References

Accelerationism
Alt-right organizations
Neo-Nazi organizations
Neo-Nazism in Australia
Neo-Nazism in Canada
Neo-Nazi organizations in the United States
Right-wing militia organizations in the United States
Organizations established in 2018
Organisations designated as terrorist by Australia
Organizations designated as terrorist by Canada
Organizations based in North America designated as terrorist
Organisations designated as terrorist by the United Kingdom
Organisations designated as terrorist by New Zealand
Neo-fascist terrorism